Mike Buck (born June 17, 1952) is an Austin, Texas-based drummer and co-owner of Antone's Record Shop located in downtown Austin.

Career
Born and raised in Fort Worth, Texas, Buck began playing drums at the age of 12. By his mid teens, he was playing in various Fort Worth-area clubs with artists such Robert Ealey, Ray Sharpe, Johnny Carroll, and Bubbles Cash.

Buck moved to Austin in the mid-1970s and joined the blues rock group, The Fabulous Thunderbirds, along with Keith Ferguson, Jimmie Vaughan, and Kim Wilson. He appeared on the Thunderbirds' first two albums, Girls Go Wild (1979) and What's The Word (1980). In 1981,  he left to form The LeRoi Brothers with guitarists, Steve Doerr and Don Leady. In addition to continuing to play with The LeRoi Brothers, Buck has performed and recorded with numerous notable artists over the years including Roky Erickson, Screamin' Jay Hawkins (Jalacy Hawkins), Roy Head, Lazy Lester (Leslie Johnson), Toni Price, Ted Roddy, and Doug Sahm.

In 1985, Buck appeared on the album, Trash, Twang And Thunder, which featured various artists known collectively as Big Guitars From Texas. The album track, "Guitar Army" ‒ featuring Buck, Frankie Camaro, Keith Ferguson, Denny Freeman, Evan Johns, and Jesse Taylor ‒ garnered a 1986 Grammy Award nomination for Best Rock Instrumental Performance.

In 2001, Buck, Eve Monsees, Speedy Sparks, and Grady Pinkerton formed Eve & The Exiles. After the group's self-titled 2004 release and several lineup changes, the Exiles released their 2008 album entitled Blow Your Mind.

In May 2009, Buck, Monsees, and Forrest Coppock purchased the central Austin record store, Antone's Record Shop, from then-current owner, Susan Antone (sister of the store's original owner, Clifford Antone).

In September 2010, Buck and Monsees were married in New Orleans.

Discography

See also
List of drummers

References

External links
Biography
Sci-Fi Diner w/Mike Buck
MotoMusic.com Frankie Camaro: Big Guitars from Texas
Blow Your Mind EVE and The Exiles album review.

American rock drummers
Living people
1952 births
Musicians from Austin, Texas
The Fabulous Thunderbirds members
The LeRoi Brothers members
20th-century American drummers
American male drummers
20th-century American male musicians